Mishu Hilmy is an American comedian, writer, actor, impressionist, and playwright. He most recently wrote, performed, and executive produced the Netflix-parody comedy special Trapped in the Netflix. He has contributed to and appeared on The Daily Show with Jon Stewart. In 2014, alongside Eric Simon, he co-wrote the Annoyance Theatre play Good Morning Gitmo.

The Chicago Reader has described Hilmy's humor as "something I happily cannot unsee." The Chicago theater and entertainment industry publication, Performink, stated: "Hilmy’s skill with impressions and interweaving of social commentary form a strong core to this solo sketch show with a definitive voice." His comedy special included over 30 characters and impressions.

He was part of the Chicago ensemble based comedy theater Under the Gun. While there he performed in a sketch revue alongside Empire's Antoine McKay. Hilmy has also performed at the Upright Citizens Brigade Theater, iO Theater, Annoyance Theater and The Second City. In 2016, Hilmy founded The Comedy Fellowship.

Some of his impressions have included Jon Hamm, Martin Scorsese, Adam Driver, and Malcolm Gladwell.

References

External links

American impressionists (entertainers)
American stand-up comedians
American satirists
Living people
American male comedians
Place of birth missing (living people)
Year of birth missing (living people)
21st-century American comedians
21st-century American non-fiction writers
21st-century American male actors
American male film actors
American male screenwriters
American male television actors
American male voice actors
American male non-fiction writers
American comedy writers
American media critics
Male actors from New York City
Male actors from Chicago
Writers from Chicago
Writers from New York City
American political commentators
American social commentators
Criticism of journalism
Upright Citizens Brigade Theater performers
Screenwriters from New York (state)
Screenwriters from Illinois
21st-century American male writers